Bhavangad Fort   (transliteration: Bhavа̄ngad Qilа̄) is a fort located at Saphale - Madhukar Nagar 3 km from village Kelve, in Palghar district, of Maharashtra. This fort is in very dilapidated condition. The outer walls, steps, parapets, bastions etc. were built without using limestone at many places. This fort was built to capture the Fort Bassein by Maratha Army.

History
This fort was built by Chimaji Appa to check the atrocities by Portuguese. This fort was built in 1737 rains with the help of 2000 laborers. This fort played a prominent role in the conquest of the fort Bassein. This fort was captured by British in 1818.

Places to see

The Fort is in a dilapidated state. Few remains of the bastion, fort walls, and the water cistern are seen on the fort. There is a temple of Bhavangadeshwar temple on the highest point on the fort. It takes about an hour to walk around the parapet wall and visit all the places of the fort.

See also 
 List of forts in Maharashtra
 List of forts in India
 Chimaji Appa
 Marathi People
 Portuguese India
 List of Maratha dynasties and states
 Battles involving the Maratha Empire
 Maratha Army
 Maratha titles
 Military history of India
 List of people involved in the Maratha Empire

References 

Buildings and structures of the Maratha Empire
Forts in Palghar district
16th-century forts in India
Tourist attractions in Konkan
Former populated places in India